Belinda Barbara Chapple (born 15 January 1975) is an Australian singer, creative director and interior designer. She was a former member of all-female pop group Bardot (2000–02), from the reality TV talent competition Popstars series 1.

Career
In late 1999, at the age of 24, Chapple auditioned for the first Australian series of Popstars, a reality television show which aimed to produce a new girl group. Belinda was selected out of over 2000 girls that auditioned across Australia.

Popstars was one of the most popular, highest-rating television programs in Australia of 2000 and with the group's overwhelming exposure, Bardot's debut single "Poison" and self-titled debut album both entered at number one on the Australian ARIA charts, achieving multi-platinum sales. Further singles "I Should've Never Let You Go" and "These Days" continued the group's success on the Australian charts and in August, Bardot embarked on its first national tour. Wood performed with her bandmates at the ARIA Music Awards of 2001 for which they were nominated in three categories. Promotional tours were made in numerous countries including Singapore, Taiwan, New Zealand, India and the United Kingdom.

Bardot returned to the spotlight in late 2001 with "ASAP", the first single from their second album. "ASAP" charted in the Top 5, as well as the following single, "I Need Somebody". In November, the group released their second album, Play It Like That, which achieved gold status upon release. In early 2002, the group embarked on their second national tour and released their final single "Love Will Find a Way" before parting amicably in March of the same year.

After Bardot's split Chapple developed two live acts; a more traditional jazz show with Darren Mapes, and her preferred dance and pop performance with choreographer and dancer Michael Boyd. She released two solo singles: the Olympic Games ballad "Where It All Began" in August 2004 and "Move Together" in April 2005. A dance-pop collaboration with UK mix master Solitaire, "Move Together" peaked at No. 26 on the ARIA Singles Chart. Chapple later became a creative director of the stage show, Sydney After Dark with The X Factor Australia's finalist Natalie Conway as a lead vocalist.

Chapple then moved onto working behind the scenes in the entertainment industry as creative director for Ice TV for Asia's Next Top Model in Singapore and as Company Manager for the talent at Universal Studios Singapore. She later studied interior design at the National Design Academy in the United Kingdom and now runs her own interior design business, House of Chapple.

In April 2020, to commemorate the 20th anniversary of the release of their debut single "Poison", Chapple and Bardot bandmates Tiffani Wood and Katie Underwood reunited remotely online to perform the song. In September 2021, it was announced that Chapple and Underwood would professionally reunite as a duo under the name Ka'Bel, with their debut single "Broken Hearted" released on 15 October 2021.

Discography

Singles

References

Living people
1975 births
Chapple, Belinda
Bardot (Australian band) members
21st-century Australian singers
21st-century Australian women singers